Alpha Ceti (α Ceti, abbreviated Alpha Cet, α Cet), officially named Menkar , is the second-brightest star in the constellation of Cetus.  It is a cool luminous red giant about 250 light years away.

Nomenclature 

Alpha Ceti is the star's Bayer designation. It has the traditional name Menkar, deriving from the Arabic word  منخر manħar "nostril" (of Cetus). In 2016, the International Astronomical Union organized a Working Group on Star Names (WGSN) to catalog and standardize proper names for stars. The WGSN's first bulletin of July 2016 included a table of the first two batches of names approved by the WGSN; which included Menkar for this star.

This star, along with γ Cet (Kaffaljidhma), δ Cet, λ Cet (also Menkar), μ Cet, ξ1 Cet and ξ2 Cet were Al Kaff al Jidhmah, "the Part of a Hand".

Structure

Despite having the Bayer designation α Ceti, at visual magnitude 2.54 this star is actually not the brightest star in the constellation Cetus. That honor goes instead to Beta Ceti at magnitude 2.04. Menkar is a red giant with a stellar classification of M1.5 IIIa. It has more than twice the mass of the Sun and, as a giant star has expanded to about 89 times the Sun's radius. The relatively low temperature gives Menkar the red hue of an M-type star.

Menkar has evolved from the main sequence after exhausting the hydrogen at its core. It has also exhausted its core helium, becoming an asymptotic giant branch star, and will probably become a highly unstable star like Mira before finally shedding its outer layers and forming a planetary nebula, leaving a relatively large white dwarf remnant.  It has been observed to periodically vary in brightness, but only with an amplitude of about one hundredth of a magnitude.

Namesakes
Menkar (AK-123) was a United States Navy Crater class cargo ship named after the star.

See also
 Alpha Ceti in fiction

References

External links
Assorted figures related to Alpha Ceti

M-type giants
Asymptotic-giant-branch stars
Cetus (constellation)
Ceti, Alpha
BD+03 0419
Ceti, 92
018884
014135
0911
Menkar